Uttu was a Mesopotamian goddess of Sumerian origin. She was associated with weaving. She appears in multiple myths, such as Enki and Ninhursag and Enki and the World Order.

Name and character

Uttu's name was written TAG×TÙG, with the sign TAG  (usually pronounced as tuku) referring to the action of weaving cloth. The word uttu could also denote a part of a loom. It is also possible that the name dTAG.NUN should be read as Uttu, though Joan Goodnick Westenholz rejected this interpretation and instead assumed that dTAG.NUN was one of the multiple writings of the name of Bizilla or a closely related goddess who like her came to be associated with Nanaya in later sources.

Uttu was regarded as the goddess of weaving. According to an esoteric explanatory text which links various materials with gods, she could be associated with colored wool.

Uttu and spiders
Thorkild Jacobsen argued that Uttu was envisioned as a spider spinning a web. However, the connection between Uttu and spiders, or more precisely between her name and the Akkadian word ettūtu ("spider"), is limited to a single text, and it might represent a "learned etymology" (scribal speculation), a folk etymology or simply rely on the terms being nearly homophonous. Two copies of the text contain slightly different versions of the same passage, "the handiwork of a spider (ettūtu) will be steady in his house," or "the handiwork of Uttu will be steady in his house." Ettūtu was only one of the words for spiders present in Akkadian texts, the other two being anzūzu (written ŠÈ.GUR4) and possibly lummû.  In Sumerian, spiders were known and aš, aš5, lùm or si14. In Mesopotamian literature spiders are mostly attested in proverbs, with a particularly well attested one descrbing a spider (ŠÈ.GUR4) putting a ḫamitu insect in fetters and then cutting it into pieces after it acted as a witness in a lawsuit against a kuzāzu insect.  Most likely the meaning of it was that an evildoer should not act as a witness. Another proverb mentions a spider (ettūtu) which prepared a net to catch a fly but ended up threatened itself by a lizard, possibly meaning that one responsible for evil deeds will be eventually defeated by a greater force. Spiders also occur as an art motif on Early Dynastic seals associated with female weavers.

Worship
Uttu was worshiped in the E-ešgar, "house of work assignment," which was a part of the Esagil temple complex in Babylon.

dTAG.NUN, who might be the same deity as Uttu, had a temple in Umma in the Early Dynastic period, built by king Il. dTAG.NUN is also attested in a theophoric name, Ur-dTAG.NUN.

Two bilingual Sumero-Akkadian incantations known from the neo-Assyrian period mention Uttu. In both cases, she is described cooperating with Inanna on spinning yarn.

Mythology
According to the myth Enki and Ninhursag, Uttu's parents were Enki and Ninkurra. In a late tradition, Ninkurra was instead a male deity and Uttu's husband. A variant of Enki and Ninhursag makes Ninkurra Uttu's grandmother and Ninimma her mother. Enki is also addressed as Uttu's father in a neo-Assyrian incantation. However, another late text documents a tradition in which her father was Anu.

In Enki and Ninhursag, Uttu is the final goddess Enki (aided by his sukkal Isimud) tries to seduce while engaging in a series of incestuous encounters with his descendants (Ninšar, Ninkurra, in a variant of the text Ninimma, and finally Uttu). Unlike the other goddesses, Uttu receives advice from Ninhursag, and probably attempts to trick Enki with a false promise of marriage under the condition that he will supply her with fresh produce. While she is initially successful, Enki manages to obtain the requested cucumbers, apples and grapes from a farmer. He approaches her for a second time disguised as a gardener and this time Uttu becomes pregnant. Ninhursag intervenes and manages to remove Enki's seed from Uttu's body, which breaks the cycle of incestuous relationships. The scene is more detailed that the previous encounters between Enki and his daughters in the same myth. Curiously, the narrative makes no reference to Uttu's association with weaving.

Uttu also appears in the myth Enki and the World Order, where she is the last of the deities awaiting the assignment of a domain. She is called a "conscientious woman" and "the silent one." It has been pointed out that both in Enki and Ninhursag and in Enki and the World Order, Uttu's appearance marks a shift in the narrative: after her encounter with Enki in the former myth, the cycle of Enki's attempts at seducing and taking advantage of the goddesses ends, while in the latter, after her destiny is declared, Inanna and her complaints about not receiving an appropriate share of the universe take the center stage.

A reference to Uttu is also known from the debate poem The Debate between Grain and Sheep, which describes a distant time before she started to weave, symbolically representing the age before the advent of civilisation and technology.

References

Bibliography

External links
 Enki and Ninhursag in the Electronic Text Corpus of Sumerian Literature
 Enki and the World Order in the Electronic Text Corpus of Sumerian Literature
 The debate between Grain and Sheep in the Electronic Text Corpus of Sumerian Literature

Mesopotamian goddesses
Crafts goddesses
Textiles in folklore